San Manuel Chaparrón is a municipality in the Jalapa department of Guatemala.

Municipalities of the Jalapa Department